The 1972 Swedish Open – Singles event was part of the 1972 Swedish Open tennis tournament and was played on outdoor clay courts in Båstad, Sweden between 10 July and 16 July 1973. Ilie Năstase was the defending Swedish Open champion. Manuel Orantes won the title by defeating Ilie Năstase in the final,  6–4, 6–3, 6–1.

Draw

Finals

Top half

Bottom half

References

External links
 ITF tournament edition details

Men's Singles
Singles